Basil Reginald Vincent Ziani de Ferranti (2 July 1930 – 24 September 1988) was a British businessman and a Conservative Party politician. He was educated at Eton and Trinity College, Cambridge, and was the grandson of the electrical engineer and inventor Sebastian de Ferranti and son of Sir Vincent Ziani de Ferranti.

He was an unsuccessful candidate at the 1955 general election in the Labour-held Manchester Exchange constituency.

In 1958, he was elected to the House of Commons as Member of Parliament for Morecambe and Lonsdale at a by-election in 1958, following the elevation to the peerage of the constituency's Conservative MP, Ian Fraser.

He held the seat at the 1959 general election, but stood down from Parliament at the 1964 election. He had held ministerial office only briefly, as Parliamentary Secretary for Aviation from July to October 1962.

He later became a member (1973–1979) and chairman (1976–1978) of the European Economic and Social Committee. He subsequently became a Member of the European Parliament (MEP), and a Vice President from 1979 to 1982. He represented the Hampshire West constituency from 1979 to 1984, and Hampshire Central from 1984 until his death.

Notes

References

1930 births
1988 deaths
Alumni of Trinity College, Cambridge
20th-century British businesspeople
Conservative Party (UK) MEPs
Conservative Party (UK) MPs for English constituencies
English people of Italian descent
Ferranti
MEPs for England 1979–1984
MEPs for England 1984–1989
Ministers in the Macmillan and Douglas-Home governments, 1957–1964
People educated at Eton College
UK MPs 1955–1959
UK MPs 1959–1964